Riad Toufic Salameh (Arabic: رياض توفيق سلامة, born July 17, 1950) is the current Governor of Lebanon's central bank, Banque du Liban since April 1993. He was appointed Governor by decree, approved by the Council of Ministers for a renewable term of six years. He was reappointed for four consecutive terms; in 1999, 2005, 2011 and 2017.

He is the longest-serving central bank governor in the world. Although credited for maintaining the stability of the Lebanese pound until 2019, Salameh is accused of corruption, money laundering and running the largest Ponzi scheme in history.

Early life
Riad Salameh was born in Antelias in 1950 into a Christian Maronite family of successful business people, long based in Liberia. His father Toufic Salameh owned the Cedars Hotel in Broummana, and his mother Raniah was a "well-known charitable activist" and Lebanese Red Cross member who was murdered in 1982. He has three siblings.

Salameh grew up in his grandfather's house in Antelias, and attended the Jesuits' Collège Notre Dame de Jamhour, followed by a bachelor's degree in economics from the American University of Beirut.

Career

Merrill Lynch 
From 1973 to 1993, Salameh worked at Merrill Lynch in Beirut and Paris, as an executive manager, and then became a vice-president and financial advisor. He met with businessman Rafic Hariri, a huge investor in the company, and became his portfolio manager.

Lebanon's central bank 
After the end of the civil war, Hariri became the prime minister and appointed Salameh as the governor of Lebanon's central bank. He took office on August 1, 1993, and was subsequently reappointed for four consecutive terms in 1999, 2005, 2011 and 2017.
Salameh chairs the BDL Central Council, the Higher Banking Commission, the AML/CFT Special Investigation Commission and the Capital Markets Authority.

He is a member of the board of governors at the International Monetary Fund (IMF) and at the Arab Monetary Fund (AMF). In 2012, he chaired the annual meetings of the International Monetary Fund (IMF) and the World Bank Group in Tokyo.

On July 1, 2013, Salameh began a two-year term to co-chair the Financial Stability Board (FSB) Regional Advisory Group for the Middle East and North Africa. He was chairman of the board of governors of the AMF in 2013.

Endeavors
Edward Gardner of the International Monetary Fund praised Salameh's policies: "You could have thought they had a crystal ball. It was very wise of the Lebanese regulators not to get involved in all these risky international investments that turned out to be the doom of many banking systems."

In a 2009 interview with Executive magazine, when asked when will Lebanon feel the impacts of the global financial crisis, Salameh answered:  

In 2016, he launched “financial engineering” operations with local lenders, combining a series of swaps including government debt, and local currency and dollar deposits, which managed to attract foreign reserves and helped to support the country's dollar-pegged currency.

During the 2019–2020 Lebanese protests, Salameh had a feud with the Prime Minister Hassan Diab, as the government decided to default on its foreign obligations, but Salameh preferred to keep using foreign reserves to pay interest to international creditors.

Other positions 
Salameh chairs the Banque du Liban Central Council, the Higher Banking Commission, the AML/CFT Special Investigation Commission and the Capital Markets Authority.
Salameh is a member of the board of governors at the International Monetary Fund (IMF) and at the Arab Monetary Fund (AMF).

Controversies

Ponzi scheme allegations 
Following the 2019–20 Lebanese protests, the Banque du Liban deposits declined by $31bn in one year, and the loan portfolio of lenders fell by $18bn, thus putting the country in its first financial crisis in three decades. The governor of the Central Bank of Lebanon, who has benefitted from an aura of prestige during 30 years, often referred to as the "magician" of finance, was, since March 2020, associated with this financial crisis by several opinions pages, such as An-Nahar and Bloomberg. According to them, Riad created a Ponzi scheme which has lasted for 30 years and which has led the State into bankruptcy and the national currency fall. French president Emmanuel Macron made the same comparison, calling for more transparency in the Lebanese financial system.

The governor answered those allegations that "the interest rates paid in Lebanon were lower than those paid in Egypt and Turkey." Also, he believes that he is "taken as a scapegoat."

Other allegations
In July 2020, a group of Lebanese lawyers formally accused Salameh of various crimes, including the embezzlement of central bank assets, and the mismanagement of public funds. On 20 July, Lebanese judge Faisal Makki ordered a protective freeze on some of Salameh's assets after ruling in favor of a complaint that he had allegedly undermined the financial standing of the state.

In August 2020, the Organized Crime and Corruption Reporting Project (OCCRP) reported that offshore companies owned by Salameh had overseas assets worth nearly US$100 million, primarily real estate, mostly in the United Kingdom, and also in Germany and Belgium.

At the end of December 2020, Riad Salameh, pointed out by some of the demonstrators, announced the opening of an ethical investigation. The inquiry is to audit the country's financial system and to verify whether political figures have used their position to override banking restrictions on foreign currency withdrawals and transfers of funds abroad.

In 2021, France and Switzerland opened investigations regarding money laundering by Salameh.

Trial 
In February 2022, a subpoena was issued by Judge Ghada Aoun after Riad Salameh failed to show up to court for questioning, while his whereabouts were unknown after a raid in his office and 2 homes, as part of an investigation for alleged misconduct and corruption. This sparked controversy with another security agency that was accused of protecting him from trial. Later in March 21, Salameh along with his brother Raja were charged for illicit enrichment by Ghassan Oueidat but also failed to attend for questioning. His brother, Raja Salameh spent a month in detention but was released on May 22 while on a record bail of 100 billion LBP.

On June 21, 2022, his home was raided again by Lebanese security forces.

References

1950 births
Living people
Lebanese bankers
Governors of Banque du Liban
Lebanese Maronites
People from Keserwan District
Collège Notre Dame de Jamhour alumni
American University of Beirut alumni